Bedlington is a town and former civil parish in Northumberland, England, with a population of 18,470 measured at the 2011 Census. Bedlington is an ancient market town, with a rich history of industry and innovative residents. Located roughly 10 miles north east of Newcastle and Newcastle Airport, Bedlington is roughly 10 minutes from the A1 road, in south-east Northumberland. Other nearby places include Morpeth to the north-west, Ashington to the north-east, Blyth to the east and Cramlington to the south. In 1961 the parish had a population of 29,403.

The town has evidence of habitation from the Bronze Age, with a burial site being located just behind what is now the main Front Street.  A cluster of Bronze Age cist burials were discovered during excavation of the site in the 1930s.  St Cuthbert's Church is the longest standing building in the town, with parts of this dating back to the 11th century and recently celebrated being 1000 years old. The church is in the heart of the original sandstone conservation town centre.  Most of the medieval town has disappeared with many of the historic buildings and factories being demolished over the years, but there are still nods to medieval street layouts. The main Front Street is currently made up of Georgian and Victorian buildings.

Today Bedlington is probably best known for being the home of the Bedlington Terrier, a dog that has taken the name across the planet, not for the first time.  At key points in history, before and during the Industrial Revolution, goods made in Bedlington made it to all corners of the globe through the distribution of nails and trains that were made in Bedlington from some 250 years ago.  With large industry first being attracted to Bedlington over 250 years ago, in the form of its world-renowned iron works, mining became an intrinsic part of Bedlington from 1838. The coal industry remained at the heart of the town until the closure of the mines in the 1980s.  Today Bedlington's Front Street is host to a number of well-established eating and drinking venues, and there is an emergence of new establishments and retailers entering the town.

The parish of Bedlington constituted the historic exclave of County Durham called Bedlingtonshire. It is famous for giving its name to a breed of dog; the Bedlington Terrier.

History
The place-name "Bedlington" is first attested circa 1050 in a biography of Saint Cuthbert, where it appears as "Bedlingtun". The name means "the town of Bedla's people".

Bedlington and the hamlets belonging to it were bought by Cutheard, Bishop of Durham, between 900 and 915, and although locally in the county of Northumberland, it became part of the county palatine (from Lat. palatium, a palace) of Durham, over which Bishop Walcher was granted royal rights by William the Conqueror.

When these rights were taken from Cuthbert Tunstall, Bishop of Durham, in 1536, Bedlington among his other properties, lost its special privileges, but was confirmed to him in 1541 with the other property of his predecessors. Together with the other lands of the see of Durham, Bedlington was made over to the ecclesiastical commissioners in 1866. Bedlingtonshire was made part of Northumberland for civil purposes by acts of parliament in 1832 and 1844.

Bedlington became an industrial town with an iron works and several coal mines, however subsequent closure of these industries in the latter half of the 20th century caused the town to undergo many changes, becoming more of a dormitory town for those working in the surrounding areas. The last of the residential housing estates, formerly built for the mining families of the town, were taken over and razed by the council with residents evicted from the 'Pit Rows' estate in the early to mid 1970s, as was part and parcel of the government's national policy of this time.

The most important historic building in Bedlington was Bedlington Old Hall, which consisted of a 15th-century pele tower with a long early 18th-century stone block adjoining, occupying a prime location on the high street. It was controversially demolished in 1959 and replaced with council offices, which are now themselves empty and for sale.

The parish was abolished on 1 April 1974 and became an unparished area in Wansbeck district.

Development

The town has several bus links, including the X21 and X22 via Arriva North East, to nearby Newcastle upon Tyne. The town has two supermarkets, a post office, and several other smaller shops.

A weekly market is held on Thursdays at the market place. The number of market stalls is now also starting to decline.

The Northumberland Line project is reopening a railway passenger service by 2024.

Education
Bedlington is served by two secondary schools: Bedlington Academy (previously Bedlingtonshire Community High School) and St Benet Biscop Catholic Academy. They are both in Bedlington, but they do take in children from Stakeford, Guide Post, Choppington, Stannington and even areas of Morpeth. Bedlington is also served by three primary schools: Bedlington Station Primary School, Stead Lane Primary School and St Bede's Primary School. One of the few middle schools left in England is Meadowdale Academy. This is soon to change however as Meadowdale is to change to a primary school. The town of Bedlington also has two first schools: Whitley Memorial C of E School and Bedlington West End County First School. Whitley Memorial C of E School became a primary school at the start of the summer 2021 term.

Local parish
One of the most important surviving historic buildings is the Anglican parish church, which is dedicated to St. Cuthbert. It is reputed that the church takes its dedication from an event that occurred 12 December 1069: fleeing northwards from the Conqueror's army, the monks of Durham are said to have rested the body of St Cuthbert in Bedlington Church. The building, originally of Saxon design, was rebuilt about a hundred years later. Little of either the Saxon or the Norman church has survived.

There is a Roman Catholic congregation who worship in a relatively new church called St Bede's. In addition, there is a Salvation Army chapel.

Hartford Hall lies within the parish. Much of the riverside land between Bedlington and the hall forms the Bedlington Country Park, a designated local nature reserve.

Local media
Local newspapers include the Evening Chronicle, the Journal, which also cover Tyneside and the rest of south east Northumberland. The Newspost Leader is weekly and covers most of the former district of Wansbeck. The community-run Bedlington Website Bedlington.co.uk was started in 1998. It has been active in many of the recent initiatives to promote the town.

There are also several radio regional stations provide local broadcasts. Local news on television is provided by ITV News Tyne Tees and BBC Look North. These TV stations cover most of the north east, County Durham, Teesside, Tyneside and Northumberland.

Notable residents
John Birkinshaw, invented wrought iron rails in 1820
Daniel Gooch (1816–1889), railway and cable engineer
John Viret Gooch (1812–1900), railway mechanical engineer
Thomas Longridge Gooch (1808–1882), civil engineer
Jayne Middlemiss (1971-), television presenter and former glamour model
Denis Murphy (1948–), Labour Party MP for Wansbeck from 1997 to 2010
Mary Weightman MBE (1906–2005), pianist and animal welfare worker
Kenneth Pearson (1951–), cricketer
Kathy Secker (1945–2015), television presenter and former model.
Chris Dobey (1990-), darts player
Callan Rydz (1998-), darts player

Twin towns

Neighbouring towns
Blyth
Cramlington
Bebside
Stakeford
Morpeth
Ashington

See also
Bedlington Terriers FC

References

External links
Bedlington Website
Wansbeck District Council

 
Towns in Northumberland
Local nature reserves in Northumberland
Former civil parishes in Northumberland